The Public Administration Campus (PAC) (जन प्रशासन क्याम्पस) is the constituent campus of Tribhuvan University (TU). PAC was the only campus for public administration studies in Nepal for a long time and is now joined by two other colleges. It is currently located at Balkhu, Kathmandu. The campus operates under Central Department of Public Administration (CDPA).

Courses 
Public Administration Campus previously offered Diploma in Public Administration (DPA) course. It was later on upgraded to Master in Public Administration (MPA). Now with the need of mid level administrators, it has started offering Bachelor in public Administration (BPA) course. Following are currently offered courses through this campus.
 Bachelor in Public Administration (BPA)
 Master in Public Administration (MPA)

Bachelor in Public Administration Campus (BPA) 
Bachelor in Public Administration (BPA) course is a 4-year, 8-semester program. It is aimed towards producing mid level administrators in the public sector of the country. It was started on 2070 BS. This program is currently available at only one place - Public Administration Campus, in the country.

Master in Public Administration (MPA) 
Master in Public Administration (MPA) is a 2-year course aimed at producing high level administrative manpower for public sector of the country. It was upgraded from DPA program, previously offered by this campus. MPA program is currently offered by Public Administration Campus and Mahendra Morang Campus (Biratnagar).

The objective of the master's degree programme in Public Administration (MPA) is to produce high-level human resources in order to serve public affairs management of the government, non-government, public enterprises and private sectors. The programme focuses on areas of specialization such as Development Administration, Human Resource Development, Public Finance, and Law and Order Administration. After successful completion of the programme, a student will be able to function as an administrator/manager in government, non-government, public enterprises and private sectors. The MPA programme specifically aims to:

Curricular Structure 

The curriculum for MPA degree comprises four separate and distinct course components as follows :

Core Courses 
Core courses integrate all functional areas and provide the students with an appreciation of the diversity and interrelationship of Public Administration, Development Administration, Public Policy Analysis, Public Financial Administration, Public Personnel Administration and Organizational Behaviour.

Analytical and Professional Core Courses 
Analytical courses are designed to enable the students to develop the skill of identifying and analyzing the problems. It includes subjects - Research Methods in Public Administration, Public Enterprise Management and Social Responsibility, International Administration and Contemporary Issues in Public Affairs Management.

Specialization Courses 
Specialization in any one of the areas, Development Administration, Human Resource Development, Public Finance and Law and Order Administration areas enables the student to develop their expertise in the functional area.

Thesis Writing 
Writing a thesis is an elective course. Students must take either four courses worth 50 points each or a thesis worth 100 points with any two courses worth 50 points each from the same specialized area while finishing the specialty areas (elective courses). The thesis must be written in the students' chosen area of specialization.

Course Composition 
The duration of MPA Program is of two year (four Semester). The student require to study following core and compulsory as well as choose one area of Specializatiom course. There will be core course, specialization course.

First Semester

Second Year
PA 600	Public Policy Analysis	(100)
PA 610	Public Enterprise Management and Social Responsibility	(100)
PA 620	International Administration	(50)
PA 630	Contemporary Issues in Public Affairs Management	(50)

Specialization Areas (Elective Courses)
Courses equivalent 200 marks to be selected from any one of the following areas.

Development Administration Area
DA 621	Rural Development	(50)
DA 622	Urban Development	(50)
DA 623	Development Planning	(50)
DA 624	Project Management	(50)

Human Resources Development Area
HR 631	Personnel Administration in Nepal	(50)
HR 632	Comparative Personnel Administration of SAARC Countries	(50)
HR 633	Labour Policy and Administration in Nepal	(50)
HR 634	Human Resources Development	(50)

Public Finance Area
PF 641	Budgeting	(50)
PF 642	Accounting system in Nepal	(50)
PF 643	Auditing system in Nepal	(50)
PF 644	Tax Administration in Nepal	(50)

Law and Order Administration Area
PO 651	Public Security and Development	(50)
PO 652	Police Administration	(50)
PO 653	Security Management	(50)
PO 654	District Administration and Law Enforcement	(50)

Thesis Writing
TH 655	Thesis	(100)

References

Tribhuvan University
1976 establishments in Nepal